Wild Angels may refer to:

Film
Wild Angels (1969 film) (Divlji anđeli) a Croatian film directed by Fadil Hadžić 
The Wild Angels 1966 film starring Peter Fonda

Music
Wild Angels (band)

Albums
Wild Angels (album), an album by Martina McBride
Wild Angels, album by Mary Anne Hobbs
The Wild Angels, soundtrack album by Davie Allan & the Arrows

Songs
Wild Angels (Martina McBride song), song by Martina McBride 	1995
"Wild Wild Angels", song by Smokie, 1976
"The Wild Angels" theme from the film "The Wild Angels (soundtrack)" 1967